Trochosa is a large wolf spider genus found worldwide.

Species
, the World Spider Catalog accepted the following species:

 Trochosa abdita (Gertsch, 1934)
 Trochosa adjacens O. Pickard-Cambridge, 1885
 Trochosa albifrons (Roewer, 1960)
 Trochosa albipilosa (Roewer, 1960)
 Trochosa albomarginata (Roewer, 1960)
 Trochosa alviolai	Barrion & Litsinger, 1995
 Trochosa aperta (Roewer, 1960)
 Trochosa aquatica	Tanaka, 1985
 Trochosa arctosina Caporiacco, 1947
 Trochosa bannaensis Yin & Chen, 1995
 Trochosa beltran (Mello-Leitão, 1942)
 Trochosa bukobae (Strand, 1916)
 Trochosa cachetiensis Mcheidze, 1997
 Trochosa canapii Barrion & Litsinger, 1995
 Trochosa charmina (Strand, 1916)
 Trochosa corporaali (Reimoser, 1935)
 Trochosa dentichelis Buchar, 1997
 Trochosa eberlanzi (Roewer, 1960)
 Trochosa entebbensis (Lessert, 1915)
 Trochosa eugeni (Roewer, 1951)
 Trochosa fabella (Karsch, 1879)
 Trochosa fageli Roewer, 1960
 Trochosa gentilis (Roewer, 1960)
 Trochosa glarea McKay, 1979
 Trochosa gravelyi Buchar, 1976
 Trochosa guatemala Chamberlin & Ivie, 1942
 Trochosa gunturensis Patel & Reddy, 1993
 Trochosa himalayensis Tikader & Malhotra, 1980
 Trochosa hirtipes Ponomarev, 2009
 Trochosa hispanica Simon, 1870
 Trochosa hoggi (Lessert, 1926)
 Trochosa honggiana Barrion, Barrion-Dupo & Heong, 2013
 Trochosa hungarica Herman, 1879
 Trochosa immaculata Savelyeva, 1972
 Trochosa insignis O. Pickard-Cambridge, 1898
 Trochosa intermedia (Roewer, 1960)
 Trochosa iviei (Gertsch & Wallace, 1937)
 Trochosa kaieteurensis (Gertsch & Wallace, 1937)
 Trochosa kalukanai (Simon, 1900)
 Trochosa kaswabilengae (Roewer, 1960)
 Trochosa liberiana (Roewer, 1960)
 Trochosa longa Qu, Peng & Yin, 2010
 Trochosa lucasi (Roewer, 1951)
 Trochosa lugubris O. Pickard-Cambridge, 1885
 Trochosa magdalenensis (Strand, 1914)
 Trochosa magna (Roewer, 1960)
 Trochosa malayana (Doleschall, 1859)
 Trochosa masumbica (Strand, 1916)
 Trochosa melloi Roewer, 1951
 Trochosa meruensis (Lessert, 1926)
 Trochosa minima (Roewer, 1960)
 Trochosa modesta (Roewer, 1960)
 Trochosa moluccensis Thorell, 1878
 Trochosa mossambicus (Roewer, 1960)
 Trochosa mundamea Roewer, 1960
 Trochosa nigerrima (Roewer, 1960)
 Trochosa niveopilosa (Mello-Leitão, 1938)
 Trochosa obscura (Roewer, 1960)
 Trochosa obscura (Mello-Leitão, 1943)
 Trochosa papakula (Strand, 1911)
 Trochosa paranaensis (Mello-Leitão, 1937)
 Trochosa pardaloides (Mello-Leitão, 1937)
 Trochosa pardosella (Strand, 1906)
 Trochosa parviguttata (Strand, 1906)
 Trochosa pelengena (Roewer, 1960)
 Trochosa praetecta L. Koch, 1875
 Trochosa presumptuosa (Holmberg, 1876)
 Trochosa propinqua O. Pickard-Cambridge, 1885
 Trochosa pseudofurva (Strand, 1906)
 Trochosa punctipes (Gravely, 1924)
 Trochosa quinquefasciata Roewer, 1960
 Trochosa reichardtiana (Strand, 1916)
 Trochosa reimoseri Bristowe, 1931
 Trochosa robusta (Simon, 1876)
 Trochosa ruandanica (Roewer, 1960)
 Trochosa ruricola (De Geer, 1778)
 Trochosa ruricoloides Schenkel, 1963
 Trochosa sanlorenziana (Petrunkevitch, 1925)
 Trochosa semoni Simon, 1896
 Trochosa sepulchralis (Montgomery, 1902)
 Trochosa sericea (Simon, 1898)
 Trochosa spinipalpis (F. O. Pickard-Cambridge, 1895)
 Trochosa suiningensis Peng, Yin, Zhang & Kim, 1997
 Trochosa tenebrosa Keyserling, 1877
 Trochosa tenella Keyserling, 1877
 Trochosa tenuis (Roewer, 1960)
 Trochosa terricola Thorell, 1856
 Trochosa unmunsanensis Paik, 1994
 Trochosa urbana O. Pickard-Cambridge, 1876
 Trochosa ursina (Schenkel, 1936)
 Trochosa vulvella (Strand, 1907)
 Trochosa wuchangensis (Schenkel, 1963)

See also 
 List of Lycosidae species
 List of Lycosidae genera

References

External links 

Lycosidae
Araneomorphae genera
Cosmopolitan spiders